Gregory Ridge is a narrow rock ridge descending westward from northern Fram Mesa in the Queen Maud Mountains of Antarctic and terminating at the east side of Amundsen Glacier. It was mapped by the United States Geological Survey from surveys and U.S. Navy air photos, 1960–64, and was named by the Advisory Committee on Antarctic Names for Lieutenant Commander N.B. Gregory, a pilot on photographic flights during U.S. Navy Operation Deep Freeze 1965.

References

Ridges of the Ross Dependency
Amundsen Coast